is a Japanese actress who is affiliated with Horipro.

Biography
In 2001, Kinami was chosen to be the Japanese High School Baseball Championship PR schoolgirl during high school. In the same year, she won the Grand Prix at the Horipro New Star Audition.

In 2002, while planning to appear in the variety series, Hiroyuki Yabe no Offer shi Chaimashita, Kinami was asked by Hiroyuki Yabe to appear in a commercial. In addition, she was selected for the female idol unit, TV Asahi Angel Eye 2002. From 2002 to 2003, Kinami appeared in the idol unit Licca. From 2004 to 2005, she appeared in the variety series Fuko no Hosoku. She played Sachiko in a reproducible drama. In 2008, Kinami graduated from Faculty of Letters of Kokugakuin University.

In 2009, she played Kyoko Koizumi in the film, 20th Century Boys, and was also evaluated in supervision and authorship. In 2013, Kinami's first main role in a film was Hyaku-nen no Tokei (directed by Shusuke Kaneko) as Ryo Kandaka.

Personal life

Kinami attended Korean school for a year as a hobby and is able to speak basic Korean.

Filmography

TV series

Films

References

External links
 Official profile at Horipro 
  

Actresses from Osaka
Japanese film actresses
Japanese idols
Japanese television actresses
1985 births
Living people
People from Toyonaka, Osaka
21st-century Japanese actresses